The Maroondah Dam is a rock-foundation concrete gravity dam with an uncontrolled rock-chute spillway across the Watts River, located in the Central region of the Australian state of Victoria. The storage created by the dam is called Maroondah Reservoir. The principal purpose of the dam and its reservoir is to supply potable water for Greater Metropolitan Melbourne.

Location and features

Constructed in the 1920s by the Melbourne and Metropolitan Board of Works, it is now operated by Melbourne Water. Like most of Melbourne's water harvesting reservoirs, the entire catchment is eucalypt forest completely closed to human activity, as is the reservoir itself. Immediately below the concrete dam, the Maroondah Reservoir Park features a large garden landscaped in an "English style", featuring many exotic plants very different from the surrounding native vegetation. A walking track leads across the dam, over the spillway, and up to a lookout from which much of the reservoir can be viewed.

History
Following the Yan Yean and Toorourrong schemes, the Maroondah Dam scheme was the third water supply source for Melbourne. The Maroondah Aqueduct was built in 1886–1881 to supply water to the Preston Reservoir from a diversion weir on the Watts River. The level of the aqueduct was determined by the site of the proposed Maroondah Reservoir, preparatory work for which was undertaken in 1915–1919. Construction commenced in October 1920 and was completed in 1927. During that period, the capacity of the Maroondah Aqueduct was increased.

In 1986, the reservoir spillway was widened to increase its flow capacity to that of a 1-in-10,000-year flood and, in 1989, the stability of the concrete dam was enhanced using ground anchors.

See also

 List of dams and reservoirs in Victoria

References

Dams in Victoria (Australia)
Melbourne Water catchment
Rivers of Greater Melbourne (region)
Dams completed in 1927
Gravity dams
1927 establishments in Australia
Yarra Ranges